The Ministry of Information, Communications, Transport and Tourism Development (MICTTD) is a government ministry of Kiribati, headquartered in Betio, South Tarawa.

Ministers
Babera Kirata (1979–1982) for Works and Communications
Temate Ereateiti (2007–2011)
Taberannang Timeon (2011–2013)
Rimeta Beniamina (2013–2016)
Willie Tokataake (2016–2020)
Tekeeua Tarati (2020–)

References

External links
MICTTD

Communications ministries

Kiribati

Kiribati
Government of Kiribati